The Aero Eli Servizi Yo-Yo 222 (sometimes written YoYo) is an Italian helicopter designed and produced by Aero Eli Servizi of L'Aquila. The aircraft is supplied complete and ready-to-fly.

Design and development
The aircraft features a single main rotor and tail rotor, a two-seats-in side-by-side configuration enclosed cockpit, skid landing gear and an American-made four-cylinder, air-cooled, four stroke  Lycoming O-320 engine.

Greatly resembling the Robinson R22, reviewer Werner Pfaendler, describes it as "obviously the result of a close look at the world's bestselling two-seater helicopter, the R22."

For lightness the aircraft fuselage is made with extensive use of carbon fiber reinforced polymer and fibreglass.

Specifications (Yo-Yo 222)

See also
List of rotorcraft

References

External links

Yo-Yo 222
2010s Italian sport aircraft
2010s Italian ultralight aircraft
2010s Italian helicopters